Polygamy in Thailand could be freely practiced before 1 October 1935. Polygamy was recognised under civil law. The old family law assigned wives to three categories in accordance with how they became wives:

The first was called mia klang muang (เมียกลางเมือง), the 'official wife', whom the husband's parents had "acquired for him".
 The second was known as mia klang nok (เมียกลางนอก), the 'minor wife', whom the man acquired after his first marriage.
 The third was mia klang thasi (เมียกลางทาสี), the title given to slave wives who were purchased from the mother and father of their prior owners.

Children of these unions were recognised as legitimate.

While polygamy has since been abolished, it is still alive in Thailand and, according to some, widely accepted. The King of Thailand may, for example, still designate "consorts" other than the Queen. Such unions are not recognised under Thai law, which states, "A man or a woman cannot marry each other while one of them has a spouse."

Even after legally recognized polygamy was abolished, double standards relating to marital behaviors continued, both in law and in practice. For example, until 2007, only men could divorce based on adultery; wives had to prove that the husband "supported and honored another woman as his wife." The 2007 legal reforms gave women and men the same legal rights with regard to divorce grounds and were part of a legal overhaul, which also included enacting laws against domestic violence, criminalizing marital rape, and removing other discriminatory legal provisions. Thailand also withdrew its reservation to Article 16 of the Convention on the Elimination of All Forms of Discrimination against Women (CEDAW), which guarantees the rights of women in all matters relating to marriage and family relations.

See also 
 Thai marriage
Sineenat Wongvajirapakdi

References 

Thai culture
Thailand